Xyza R. Diazen-Santos (born May 3, 1986) is a Filipina politician and teacher who served as a city councilor for Marikina's Second District from 2010 to 2019.

Early life 
Diazen was born on May 3, 1986 in Marikina. She is the daughter of Rogelio and Evelyn Diazen. After graduating from Parang High School, Diazen was elected as one of the Sangguniang Kabataan (SK) councilors of Marikina in the 2002 elections. While serving as SK councilor, she took up a degree in secondary education at the National Teachers College, wherein she was a MAPEH department officer and a dance troupe member.

Political Career

Parang Barangay Council 
In the 2007 elections, Diazen was elected as one of the Barangay councilors of Parang, Marikina. She served as Chairman of the Committee on Barangay Affairs and Committee on Education.

City Council

2010 Marikina Local Elections 

In 2010, Diazen ran for a seat in the Marikina City Council for its second district. She was elected to the post with the second highest amount of votes. With Diazen being sworn in as city councilor on June 30, 2010 she became one of the most youngest councilors in the city's history.

Tenure 
As city councilor, Diazen was a member of ten committees in the Marikina city council, namely: Tourism, Culture and Arts, Disaster Preparedness, Mitigation and Management (both as Chairman), Appropriations, Cooperatives, Communications and Information Technology, Environmental Protection, Parks Development, People’s Participation, Ways and Means, and Women’s and Family Affairs. She passed five ordinances and 21 resolutions with one of the more significant ordinances she introduced was about the implementation of a Marikina City Disaster Reduction and Management Plan, and the creation of Barangay Disaster Risk Reduction and Management Committees. In February 2012, she was one of the members of the Philippine delegation sent by the country in accordance to strengthening political exchanges between the Philippines and Australia.

Diazen would go on being reelected as city councilor in 2013 and 2016. She was term-limited by 2019.

Post-Councilorship

2022 Marikina Local Elections 

In 2022, Diazen sought a comeback to the City Council as a councilor for the second district under the Aksyon Demokratiko party in a coalition led by Del de Guzman. She would later be defeated in the race, placing twelfth out of twenty-seven candidates.

Electoral History

References

External links
Facebook profile
Facebook fan page

1986 births
Living people
People from Marikina
Metro Manila city and municipal councilors
Liberal Party (Philippines) politicians
Aksyon Demokratiko politicians
21st-century Filipino women politicians
21st-century Filipino politicians